In linguistics, conjugation is the creation of derived forms of a verb from its principal parts by inflection (alteration of form according to rules of grammar). For instance, the verb break can be conjugated to form the words break, breaks, broke, broken and breaking. While English has a relatively simple conjugation, other languages such as French and Arabic or Spanish are more complex, with each verb having dozens of conjugated forms. Some languages such as Georgian and Basque have highly complex conjugation systems with hundreds of possible conjugations for every verb.

Verbs may inflect for grammatical categories such as person, number, gender, case, tense, aspect, mood, voice, possession, definiteness, politeness, causativity, clusivity, interrogatives, transitivity, valency, polarity, telicity, volition, mirativity, evidentiality, animacy, associativity, pluractionality, and reciprocity. Verbs may also be affected by agreement, polypersonal agreement, incorporation, noun class, noun classifiers, and verb classifiers. Agglutinative and polysynthetic languages tend to have the most complex conjugations, albeit some fusional languages such as Archi can also have extremely complex conjugation.  Typically the principal parts are the root and/or several modifications of it (stems). All the different forms of the same verb constitute a lexeme, and the canonical form of the verb that is conventionally used to represent that lexeme (as seen in dictionary entries) is called a lemma.

The term conjugation is applied only to the inflection of verbs, and not of other parts of speech (inflection of nouns and adjectives is known as declension). Also it is often restricted to denoting the formation of finite forms of a verb – these may be referred to as conjugated forms, as opposed to non-finite forms, such as the infinitive or gerund, which tend not to be marked for most of the grammatical categories.

Conjugation is also the traditional name for a group of verbs that share a similar conjugation pattern in a particular language (a verb class). For example, Latin is said to have four conjugations of verbs. This means that any regular Latin verb can be conjugated in any person, number, tense, mood, and voice by knowing which of the four conjugation groups it belongs to, and its principal parts. A verb that does not follow all of the standard conjugation patterns of the language is said to be an irregular verb. The system of all conjugated variants of a particular verb or class of verbs is called a verb paradigm; this may be presented in the form of a conjugation table.

Verbal agreement
Verbal agreement, or concord, is a morpho-syntactic construct in which properties of the subject and/or objects of a verb are indicated by the verb form.  Verbs are then said to agree with their subjects (resp. objects).

Many English verbs exhibit subject agreement of the following sort: whereas I go, you go, we go, they go are all grammatical in standard English, he go is not (except in the subjunctive, as "They requested that he go with them").  Instead, a special form of the verb to go has to be used to produce he goes.  On the other hand I goes, you goes etc. are not grammatical in standard English.  (Things are different in some English dialects that lack agreement.)  A few English verbs have no special forms that indicate subject agreement (I may, you may, he may), and the verb to be has an additional form am that can only be used with the pronoun I as the subject.

Verbs in written French exhibit more intensive agreement morphology than English verbs: je suis (I am), tu es ("you are", singular informal), elle est (she is), nous sommes (we are), vous êtes ("you are", plural), ils sont (they are).  Historically, English used to have a similar verbal paradigm. Some historic verb forms are used by Shakespeare as slightly archaic or more formal variants (I do, thou dost, he doth, typically used by nobility) of the modern forms.

Some languages with verbal agreement can leave certain subjects implicit when the subject is fully determined by the verb form. In Spanish, for instance, subject pronouns do not need to be explicitly present, but in French, its close relative, they are obligatory. The Spanish equivalent to the French je suis (I am) can be simply soy (lit. "am").  The pronoun yo (I) in the explicit form yo soy is used only for emphasis or to clear ambiguity in complex texts.

Some languages have a richer agreement system in which verbs agree also with some or all of their objects. Ubykh exhibits verbal agreement for the subject, direct object, indirect object, benefaction and ablative objects (a.w3.s.xe.n.t'u.n, you gave it to him for me).

Basque can show agreement not only for subject, direct object and indirect object but it also can exhibit agreement for the listener as the implicit benefactor:  means "they brought us the car" (neuter agreement for the listener), but  means "they brought us the car" (agreement for feminine singular listener).

Languages with a rich agreement morphology facilitate relatively free word order without leading to increased ambiguity. The canonical word order in Basque is subject–object–verb, but all permutations of subject, verb and object are permitted.

Nonverbal person agreement
In some languages, predicative adjectives and copular complements receive a form of person agreement that is distinct from that used on ordinary predicative verbs. Although that is a form of conjugation in that it refers back to the person of the subject, it is not "verbal" because it always derives from pronouns that have become clitic to the nouns to which they refer. An example of nonverbal person agreement, along with contrasting verbal conjugation, can be found from Beja (person agreement affixes in bold):

 wun.tu.wi, “you (fem.) are big”
 hadá.b.wa, “you (masc.) are a sheik”
 e.n.fór, “he flees”

Another example can be found from Ket:

 fèmba.di, “I am a Tungus”
 dɨ.fen, “I am standing”

In Turkic, and a few Uralic and Australian Aboriginal languages, predicative adjectives and copular complements take affixes that are identical to those used on predicative verbs, but their negation is different. For example, in Turkish:

 koş.u.yor.sun “you are running”
 çavuş.sun “you are a sergeant”

Under negation, that becomes (negative affixes in bold):

 koş.mu.yor.sun “you are not running”
 çavuş değil.sin “you are not a sergeant”

Therefore, the person agreement affixes used with predicative adjectives and nominals in Turkic languages are considered to be nonverbal in character. In some analyses, they are viewed as a form of verbal takeover by a copular strategy.

Factors that affect conjugation
These common grammatical categories affect how verbs can be conjugated:
Finite verb forms:
Grammatical person
Grammatical number
Grammatical gender
Grammatical tense
Grammatical aspect
Grammatical mood
Grammatical voice
Non-finite verb forms.

Here are other factors that may affect conjugation:
Degree of formality (see T–V distinction, Honorific speech in Japanese, Korean speech levels)
Clusivity (of personal pronouns)
Transitivity
Valency

Examples
Indo-European languages usually inflect verbs for several grammatical categories in complex paradigms, although some, like English, have simplified verb conjugation to a large extent. Below is the conjugation of the verb to be in the present tense (of the infinitive, if it exists, and indicative moods), in English, German, Yiddish, Dutch, Afrikaans, Icelandic, Faroese, Swedish, Norwegian, Latvian, Bulgarian, Serbo-Croatian, Polish, Slovenian, Macedonian, Urdu or Hindi, Persian, Latin, French, Italian, Spanish, Portuguese, Russian, Albanian, Armenian, Irish, Ukrainian, Ancient Attic Greek and Modern Greek. This is usually the most irregular verb. The similarities in corresponding verb forms may be noticed. Some of the conjugations may be disused, like the English thou-form, or have additional meanings, like the English you-form, which can also stand for second person singular or be impersonal.

{| class="wikitable"
|+ |"To be" in several Indo-European languages
|-
! rowspan="3" style="text-align:left" | Branch
! rowspan="3" style="text-align:left" | Language
! rowspan="3" style="text-align:left" | Presentinfinitive
! colspan="6" | Present indicative
|-
! colspan="3" | Singular persons
! colspan="3" | Plural persons
|-
! 1st !! 2nd !! 3rd
! 1st !! 2nd !! 3rd
|-
| colspan="9" style="height:3px" |
|-
! style="text-align:left" rowspan="14" | Germanic
! style="text-align:left" | Proto-Germanic
| 
| *immi
| *izi	
| *isti	
| *izum	
| *izud	
| *sindi	
|-
! style="text-align:left" | Anglo-Saxon
| 
| eom
| eart
| is
| colspan="3" style="text-align:center" | sindsindon
|-
! style="text-align:left" | English
| 
| am
| areart1be'st1
| isare10
| colspan="3" style="text-align:center" | are
|-
! style="text-align:left" | German
| 
| bin
| bist
| ist
| sind
| seid
| sind
|-
! style="text-align:left" | Yiddishtransliterated
| 
| ביןbin
| ביסטbist
| איזiz
| זענעןzenen
| זענטzent
| זענעןzenen
|-
! style="text-align:left" | Luxembourgish
| 
| sinn
| bass
| ass
| sinn
| sidd
| sinn
|-
! style="text-align:left" | Dutch
| 
| ben
| bentzijt2
| is
| colspan="3" style="text-align:center" | zijn
|-
! style="text-align:left" | Afrikaans
| 
| colspan="6" style="text-align:center" | is
|-
! style="text-align:left" | Old Norse
| 
| em
| estert
| eser
| erum
| eruð
| eru
|-
! style="text-align:left" | Icelandic
| 
| er
| ert
| er
| erum
| eruð
| eru
|-
! style="text-align:left" | Faroese
| 
| eri
| ert
| er
| colspan="3" style="text-align:center" | eru
|-
! style="text-align:left" | Norwegian
| 3 (Bokmål), 4 (Nynorsk)
| colspan="6" style="text-align:center"| er
|-
! style="text-align:left" | Danish
| 
| colspan="6" style="text-align:center" | er
|-
! style="text-align:left" | Swedish
| 
| colspan="6" style="text-align:center" | är
|-
| colspan="9" style="height:3px" |
|-
! rowspan="13" style="text-align:left" | Italic
! style="text-align:left" | Latin
| esse
| 
| es
| est
| sumus
| estis
| sunt
|-
! style="text-align:left" | Italian
| 
| sono
| sei
| è
| siamo
| siete
| sono
|-
! style="text-align:left" | French
| 
| suis
| es
| est
| sommes
| êtes
| sont
|-
! style="text-align:left" | Catalan
| 
| sóc
| etseres12
| és
| som
| sou
| són
|-
! style="text-align:left" | Lombard
| 
| (a) son
| te sé
| lè
| somsem13
| sî
| i è(i) enn13
|-
! style="text-align:left" | Venetian
| 
| son
| te si
| el ze
| semo
| si
| i ze
|-
! style="text-align:left" | Spanish
| 
| soy
| eres
| es
| somos
| sois
son
| son
|-
! style="text-align:left" | Galician
| 
| son
| es
| é
| somos
| sodes
| son
|-
! style="text-align:left" | Portuguese
| 
| sou
| és
| é
| somos
| sois
| são
|-
! style="text-align:left" | Sardinian (LSC)
| 
| so
| ses
| est
| semus
| seis
| sunt
|-
! style="text-align:left" | Friulian
| 
| soi
| sês
| è
| sin
| sês
| son
|-
! style="text-align:left" | Neapolitan
| 
| songo, so
| sî
| è
| simmo
| site
| songo, so
|-
! style="text-align:left" | Romanian
| a 
| sunt
| ești
| este
| suntem
| sunteți
| sunt
|-
| colspan="9" style="height:3px" |
|-
! style="text-align:left" rowspan="3" | Celtic
! style="text-align:left" | Irish
| bheith
| 
| colspan="2" style="text-align:center" |bíonn
| bímid
| colspan="2" style="text-align:center" |bíonn
|-
! style="text-align:left" | Welsh (standard form)
| 
| rydw
| rwyt
| mae
| rydych
| rydyn
| maen
|-
! style="text-align:left" | Breton
| 
| on
| out
| eo
| omp
| oc'h
| int
|-
| colspan="9" style="height:3px" |
|-
! style="text-align:left" rowspan="2" | Greek
! style="text-align:left" | Ancient5transliterated
| eînai
| eimí
| eî
| estí
| esmén
| esté
| eisí
|-
! style="text-align:left" | Moderntransliterated
| όντας6óntas
| είμαιeímai
| είσαιeísai
| είναιeínai
| είμαστεeímaste
| είσ(ασ)τεeís(as)te
| είναιeínai
|-
| colspan="9" style="height:3px" |
|-
! style="text-align:left" colspan="2" | Albanian
| me qenë
| jam
| je
| është
| jemi
| jeni
| janë
|-
| colspan="9" style="height:3px" |
|-
! style="text-align:left" rowspan="2"| Armenian
! style="text-align:left" | Westerntransliterated
| ĕllal
| em
| es
| ē
| enk‘
| ēk‘
| en
|-
! style="text-align:left" | Easterntransliterated
| linel
| em
| es
| ē
| enk‘
| ek‘
| en
|-
| colspan="9" style="height:3px" |
|-
! style="text-align:left" rowspan="10" | Slavic
! style="text-align:left" | Czech
| 
| jsem
| jsi
| je
| jsme
| jste
| jsou
|-
! style="text-align:left" | Slovak
| 
| som
| si
| je
| sme
| ste
| sú
|-
! style="text-align:left" | Polish
| 
| jestem
| jesteś
| jest
| jesteśmy
| jesteście
| są
|-
! style="text-align:left" | Russiantransliterated
| byt| colspan="6" style="text-align:center" | естьyest|-
! style="text-align:left" | Ukrainiantransliterated
| buty
| colspan="6" style="text-align:center" | єye
|-
! style="text-align:left" | Serbo-Croatian strong
| biti
| jesam
| jesi
| jest(e)
| jesmo
| jeste
| jesu
|-
! style="text-align:left" | Serbo-Croatian clitic
| none
| sam
| si
| je
| smo
| ste
| su
|-
! style="text-align:left" | Slovenian
| biti
| sem
| si
| je
| smo
| ste
| so
|-
! style="text-align:left" | Bulgariantransliterated
| none
| съмsăm
| сиsi
| еe
| смеsme
| стеste
| саsă
|-
! style="text-align:left" | Macedoniantransliterated
| none
| sum
| сиsi
| еe
| смеsme
| стеste
| сеse
|-
| colspan="9" style="height:3px" |
|-
! style="text-align:left" rowspan="2"| Baltic
! style="text-align:left" | Latvian
| 
| esmu
| esi
| ir
| esam
| esat
| ir
|-
! style="text-align:left" | Lithuanian
| 
| esu
| esi
| yra
| esame
| esate
| yra
|-
| colspan="9" |
|-
! style="text-align:left" rowspan="7" | Indo-Iranian
! style="text-align:left" | Persiantransliterated
|  budan
|  æm
|  ei
| æst (æ)9
|  eem
| eed (spoken: een)
|  and (spoken: an)
|-
! style="text-align:left" | Sanskrittransliterated
| 
| अस्मिasmi
| असिasi
| अस्तिasti
| स्मःsmah
| स्थstha
| सन्तिsanti
|-
! style="text-align:left" | HindustaniDevanagari ScriptPerso-Arabic Scripttransliterated (ISO 15819)
| 
| हूँhūm̥
| colspan="2" | हैhai
| हैंhaim̥
| होho
| हैंhaim̥
|-
! style="text-align:left" | Marathitransliterated (ISO 15819)
| 
| आहेāhe
| आहेसāhes
| आहेāhe
| आहोतāhot
| आहातāhāt
| आहेतāhet
|-
! style="text-align:left" | Gujaratitransliterated (ISO 15819)
| 
| છુંchũ
| colspan="2" style="text-align:center" | છેche
| છીએchīe
| છોcho
| છેche
|-
! style="text-align:left" | Bengalitransliterated (ISO 15819)
| 
| হইhoi
| হও11hôo
| হয়11hôy
| হইhoi
| হও11hôo
| হয়11hôy
|-
! style="text-align:left" | Assamesetransliterated (ISO 15819)
| 
| হওঁhoü̃
| হোৱাhüa
| হয়hoy
| হওঁhoü̃
| হোৱাhüa
| হয়hoy
|}

1 Archaic, poetical; used only with the pronoun 'thou'.
2 In Flemish dialects.
3 In the bokmål written standard.
4 In the nynorsk written standard. vera and vere are both alternate forms.
5 Attic.
6 'eínai' is only used as a noun ("being, existence").
7 Ptc: .
8 In the Tosk and Geg dialects, respectively.
9 Existential: هست (hæst) has another meaning. Usage of (æ) is considered to be colloquial, now. See, Indo-European copula
10 With the Singular they 3rd person pronoun.
11 Bengali verbs are further conjugated according to formality. There are three verb forms for 2nd person pronouns: হও (hôo, familiar), হোস (hoś, very familiar) and হন (hôn, polite). Also two forms for 3rd person pronouns: হয় (hôy, familiar) and হন (hôn, polite). Plural verb forms are exact same as singular.
12 Valencian.
13 Western varieties only.

 Conjugation classes 
 Pama-Nyungan languages 
One common feature of Pama–Nyungan languages, the largest family of Australian Aboriginal languages, is the notion of conjugation classes, which are a set of groups into which each lexical verb falls. They determine how a verb is conjugated for Tense–aspect–mood. The classes can but do not universally correspond to the transitivity or valency of the verb in question. Generally, of the two to six conjugation classes in a Pama-Nyungan language, two classes are open with a large membership and allow for new coinages, and the remainder are closed and of limited membership.

 Wati 
In Wati languages, verbs generally fall into four classes:

 l class
 ∅ class
 n class
 ng class

They are labelled by using common morphological components of verb endings in each respective class in infinitival forms. In the Wanman language these each correspond to la, ya, rra, and wa verbs respectively.

See also a similar table of verb classes and conjugations in Pitjantjatjara, a Wati language wherein the correlating verb classes are presented below also by their imperative verbal endings -la, -∅, -ra and -wa respectively

 Ngayarta 
Ngarla, a member of the Ngayarda sub-family of languages has a binary conjugation system labelled:

 l class
 ∅ class

In the case of Ngarla, there is a notably strong correlation between conjugation class and transitivity, with transitive/ditransitive verbs falling in the l-class and intransitive/semi-transitive verbs in the ∅-class.

These classes even extend to how verbs are nominalized as instruments with the l-class verb including the addition of an /l/ before the nominalizing suffix and the blank class remaining blank:l-class example:∅-class example Yidiny 
Yidiny has a ternary verb class system with two open classes and one closed class (~20 members). Verbs are classified as:

 -n class     (open, intransitive/semi-transitive)
 -l class      (open, transitive/ditransitive)
 -r''' class     (closed, intransitive)

See also

Agreement (linguistics)
Declension (nouns, adjectives, etc.'')
Inflection
Redundancy (linguistics)
Screeve
Strong inflection
Verb
Verb argument
Volition (linguistics)
Weak inflection

Conjugations by language 
:Category:Grammatical conjugation
Indo-European copula
Archivium: Italian verbs conjugator, for regular and irregular verbs

References

 
Grammatical number
Linguistics terminology